The Sawtelle Veterans Home was a care home for disabled American veterans in what is today part of the Los Angeles metropolitan area (see Sawtelle, Los Angeles) in California in the United States. The following year, the site grew by an additional ; in 1890,  more were appended for use as a veterans' cemetery. With more than 1,000 veterans in residence, a new hospital was erected in 1900. This hospital was replaced in 1927 by the James W. Wadsworth Hospital, now known as the West Los Angeles VA Medical Center'.

National Asylum for Disabled Volunteer Soldiers
In 1865, Congress passed legislation to incorporate the National Asylum for Disabled Volunteer Soldiers and Sailors of the Civil War.  Volunteers were not eligible for care in the existing regular army and navy home facilities.  This legislation, one of the last Acts signed by President Lincoln, marked the entrance of the United States into the direct provision of care for the temporary versus career military.  The Asylum was renamed the National Home for Disabled Volunteer Soldiers (NHDVS) in 1873.  It was also known colloquially as the Old Soldiers Home.  Between 1867 and 1929, the Home expanded to ten branches and one sanatorium.

The Board of Managers were empowered to establish the Home at such locations as they deemed appropriate and to establish those programs that they determined necessary. The Home was a unique creation of the Congress.  While the Managers included, ex-officio, the President of the United States, the Secretary of War and the Chief Justice of the Supreme Court, it was not a part of the Executive branch of government. Its budget requests in later years were submitted in conjunction with the War Department.  But throughout its existence, until 1930, the Board of Managers consistently defended its independence of the Executive Branch.

In 1900 admission was extended to all honorably discharged officers, soldiers and sailors who served in regular or volunteer forces of the United States in any war in which the country had been engaged and who were disabled, who had no adequate means of support and were incapable of earning a living.  As formal declarations of war were not the rule in the Indian Wars, Congress specifically extended eligibility for the Home to those who "served against hostile Indians" in 1908.  Veterans who served in the Philippines, China and Alaska were covered in 1909.

Pacific Branch
Due to increased demand as a result of widening of admission standards,  in 1887 Congress approved the establishment of a Pacific Branch of the Home.  The Pacific Branch was established under an act of Congress approved March 2, 1887, entitled "An act to provide for the location and erection of a Branch Home for Disabled Volunteer Soldiers west of the Rocky Mountains."

 Land donation 

The proposed establishment prompted intense competition, as local promoters recognized the value of a prominent, prestigious institution. The selected site for the Pacific Branch on land near Santa Monica was influenced by donations of land and cash ($100,000) and water (120,000 gallons per day) from Senator John P. Jones and Robert S. Baker, and his wife Arcadia Bandini de Stearns Baker. Jones and Baker were involved in the development of Santa Monica and believed the Pacific Branch would contribute to the growth of the community and the area.

 Development 

Prominent architect Stanford White is credited with designing the original shingle style frame barracks. J. Lee Burton designed a streetcar depot and the shingle style chapel in 1900. The Barry Hospital was built in sections from 1891 to 1909. Plantings of pines, palm trees, and eucalyptus groves transformed the site from its treeless state.

 Administration 

Although the Board of Managers established regulations for the operation of the NHDVS system and oversaw those operations, many decisions were made at the local level by local managers (who were members of the Board of Managers)

or branch governors (chief administrative officers).

The Branch twice became the object of local controversy, fueled by newspaper coverage. In 1889, the Board of Managers conducted an investigation of the Pacific Branch after a number of charges, including poor treatment of members, bad food, and corrupt management, were leveled.  The Board found little cause for concern, as their only action was to remind the governor of the Branch of his responsibilities.

In 1912, the US Senate, prompted by newspaper reports, investigated the operations of Pacific Branch but found little basis for the charges.

 Other notable people 

Other notable people associated with the Pacific Branch include:

 Sawtelle 

The Pacific Branch served as an attraction for both tourists and local real estate speculators.  In 1904, Los Angeles Pacific Railroad's branch became a stop on the Balloon RoutePacific Electric Santa Monica Air Line – a popular tour of local attractions conducted by an entrepreneur who escorted tourists via a rented streetcar.  In 1905, residential lots and larger tracts in the new Westgate Subdivision, which joined “the beautiful Soldier’s Home”, and which was owned and promoted by Jones and Baker’s Santa Monica Land and Water Company, were for sale.  The new community of Sawtelle developed around the Pacific Branch when veterans’ families, as well as veterans themselves who were drawing relief, settled there.

James W. Wadsworth Hospital

Following World War I, a new governmental agency, the Veterans Bureau, was created to provide for the hospitalization and rehabilitation of this much younger group of veterans.  The development of medical facilities for veterans during the 1920s fueled a burst of construction during that decade, including Colonial Revival staff residences.  The James W. Wadsworth Hospital opened in 1927, replacing the Barry Hospital.

 Veterans Administration 

The National Home and the Veterans Bureau, were combined into the United States Veterans Administration by President Hoover in 1930.  Planning began for a major building campaign, including Mission/Spanish Colonial style hospital buildings and a group of Romanesque-inspired research buildings.  The present Wadsworth hospital was constructed in the late 1930s.  A new theater replaced the former Ward Theater in 1940.  Most of the 1890s era buildings were demolished in the 1960s.  The Veterans Affairs (VA) hospital building (VA Wadsworth Medical Center) was opened in 1977.

VA West Los Angeles Medical Center
The VA West Los Angeles Medical Center of the VA Greater Los Angeles Health Care System is a hospital and tertiary health care facility south of Wilshire Boulevard and west of the San Diego Freeway on the Sawtelle Campus. It provides a broad range of health care services to veterans.  The largest of the VA's health care campuses, it is a part of the VA Desert Pacific Network.

 References 

 
 Leo E. Mallonee, Birth and Growth of VA Center, LA, Wiltell News, April 10, 1963, reprinted from Westways 48, June 1956.
 Duncan Underhill, Sawtelle, Fairest of Warriors’ Retreats, Wiltell News, April 10, 1963, reprinted from Westways 48, June 1956.
 Judith G. Cetina, A History of Veterans' Homes in the United States: 1811–1930, Ph.D. dissertation, Case Western Reserve University, 1977.
 
 Report of The Board of Managers  Of The National Home For Disabled Volunteer Soldiers'', 54th Congress, House of Representatives. (Document  No. 46). Government Printing Office., Washington, 1896

External links 

 1900 USGS topographic map 
 Los Angeles in the 1900s, Sawtelle and the Veterans Hospital 
 Los Angeles National Cemetery
 “NHDVS” Harper's Magazine, October 1886
 National Park Service Photographs and Site Map 
 History of the National Home for Disabled Volunteer Soldiers
 VA Virtual Museum 
 Sawtelle Disabled Veterans Home, Los Angeles Case Files, 1888–1933
 Veterans Park Conservancy
 

Sawtelle, Los Angeles
Government buildings in Los Angeles
History of Los Angeles
History of Santa Monica, California
Old soldiers' homes in the United States
1888 establishments in California
19th century in Los Angeles
West Los Angeles